A shell game is a confidence trick. 

Shell game(s) may also refer to:

Film and television
The Shell Game (film), a 1918 American film
Shell Game (TV series), a 1987 American TV series
The Shell Game, a 1980 TVB programme
Shell Game (pricing game), a pricing game on The Price Is Right

Television episodes
"The Shell Game" (Voltron)
"Shell Game" (American Dad!)
"Shell Game" (My Life as a Teenage Robot)
"Shell Games" (Fantastic Four: World's Greatest Heroes)
"Shell Games" (Malibu Country)
"Shell Games" (SpongeBob SquarePants)

Literature
"Shell Game" (short story), a 1954 short story by Philip K. Dick
Shell Game, a 1950 novel by Richard P. Powell
The Shell Game, a 2008 novel by Steve Alten

Music
The Shell Game (album), by Tim Berne, 2001
"Shell Games", a song by Bright Eyes from The People's Key

See also
Shell corporation